Slovenia competed at the 2016 Summer Olympics in Rio de Janeiro, Brazil, from 5 to 21 August 2016. This was the nation's seventh consecutive appearance at the Summer Olympics as an independent nation.

The Slovenian Olympic Committee fielded a team of 63 athletes, 39 men and 24 women, across 12 sports at the Games. Men's handball was the only team sport in which Slovenia qualified for the Games, returning to the Olympics after being absent from the previous two editions.

Of the 63 participants, twenty-one of them had past Olympic experience, with sailor Vasilij Žbogar (bronze in Athens 2004 and silver in Beijing 2008) headed to his fifth straight Games as the most experienced competitor and a potential medal favorite in the Finn class. The only medalist returning from the previous Games to compete in Rio de Janeiro, Žbogar was selected by the committee to lead the Slovenian delegation as the flag bearer in the opening ceremony. Other notable Slovenian athletes included world judo champion Tina Trstenjak in the women's 63 kg, two-time slalom kayak world champion Peter Kauzer, and three-time world championship medalist in canoeing Benjamin Savšek.

Slovenia left Rio de Janeiro with four medals (1 gold, 2 silver, and 1 bronze), which matched its overall tally from both Athens 2004 and London 2012. Among the nation's medalists were Trstenjak, who succeeded Urška Žolnir to become the Olympic champion in the women's 63 kg; Kauzer, who improved upon his sixth-place feat from London by taking a silver in the men's slalom K-1; and Žbogar, who capped off his fifth Games with a silver and third medal overall of his Olympic career in the Finn class, making him one of the most successful Olympians in the history of independent Slovenia.

Medalists

| width=78% align=left valign=top |

| width=22% align=left valign=top |

Athletics

Slovenian athletes have so far achieved qualifying standards in the following athletics events (up to a maximum of 3 athletes in each event):

Track & road events

Field events

Canoeing

Slalom
Slovenian canoeists have qualified a maximum of one boat in each of the following classes through the 2015 ICF Canoe Slalom World Championships.

Sprint
Slovenian canoeists have qualified one boat in each of the following events through the 2015 ICF Canoe Sprint World Championships.

Qualification Legend: FA = Qualify to final (medal); FB = Qualify to final B (non-medal)

Cycling

Road
Slovenian riders qualified for a maximum of four quota places in the men's Olympic road race by virtue of their top 15 final national ranking in the 2015 UCI World and Europe Tour. One additional spot was awarded to the Slovenian cyclist in the women's road race by virtue of her top 100 individual placement in the 2016 UCI World Rankings.

Mountain biking
Slovenian mountain bikers qualified for two women's quota places into the Olympic cross-country race, as a result of the nation's sixth-place finish in the UCI Olympic Ranking List of May 25, 2016.

Gymnastics

Artistic
Slovenia has entered one artistic gymnast into the Olympic competition. Teja Belak had claimed her Olympic spot in the women's apparatus and all-around events at the Olympic Test Event in Rio de Janeiro.

Women

Handball

Summary

Men's tournament

The Slovenian men's handball team qualified for the Olympics by virtue of a top two finish at the second meet of the Olympic Qualification Tournament in Malmö, Sweden, signifying the nation's Olympic comeback to the sport for the first time since 2004.

Team roster

Group stage

Quarterfinal

Judo

Slovenia has qualified a total of five judokas for the following weight classes at the Games. Mihael Žgank, Tina Trstenjak, Anamari Velenšek, and two-time Olympian Rok Drakšič were ranked among the top 22 eligible judokas for men and top 14 for women in the IJF World Ranking List of May 30, 2016, while Adrian Gomboc at men's half-lightweight (66 kg) earned a continental quota spot from the European region, as the highest-ranked Slovenian judoka outside of direct qualifying position.

Sailing

Slovenian sailors have qualified one boat in each of the following classes through the 2014 ISAF Sailing World Championships, the individual Worlds, and European qualifying regattas.

M = Medal race; EL = Eliminated – did not advance into the medal race

Shooting

Slovenian shooters have achieved quota places for the following events by virtue of their best finishes at the 2014 and 2015 ISSF World Championships, the 2015 ISSF World Cup series, and European Championships or Games, as long as they obtained a minimum qualifying score (MQS) by March 31, 2016.

Qualification Legend: Q = Qualify for the next round; q = Qualify for the bronze medal (shotgun)

Swimming

Slovenian swimmers have so far achieved qualifying standards in the following events (up to a maximum of 2 swimmers in each event at the Olympic Qualifying Time (OQT), and potentially 1 at the Olympic Selection Time (OST)):

Men

Women

Table tennis

Slovenia has entered one athlete into the table tennis competition at the Games. 2012 Olympian Bojan Tokič secured one of ten available Olympic spots in the men's singles by winning the group final match at the European Qualification Tournament in Halmstad, Sweden.

Tennis

Slovenia has entered one tennis player into the Olympic tournament. Due to the withdrawal of several tennis players from the Games, Polona Hercog (world no. 84) received a spare ITF Olympic place to compete in the women's singles, as the next highest-ranked eligible player, not yet qualified, in the WTA World Rankings as of June 6, 2016.

Triathlon

Slovenia has entered one triathlete to compete at the Games. London 2012 Olympian Mateja Šimic was ranked among the top 40 eligible triathletes in the women's event based on the ITU Olympic Qualification List as of May 15, 2016.

See also
Slovenia at the 2016 Summer Paralympics

References

External links 

 Rio 2016 Olympic Coverage – Slovenian Olympic Committee 

Olympics
Nations at the 2016 Summer Olympics
2016